Josef Blösche (12 February 1912 – 29 July 1969) was a member of the Nazi Party who served in the SS and SD during World War II. Blösche shot and killed many Jews, and helped send many more Jews to their deaths in extermination camps. He also participated in several massacres. 

Blösche became known to the world because he was photographed five times with SS forces that suppressed the Warsaw Ghetto Uprising, as published in the Stroop Report. The most famous photograph portrays a boy surrendering in the foreground, and Blösche as the SS man who is facing the boy with a sub-machine gun in hand. The Report was used in prosecuting former Nazis for war crimes. Blösche initially avoided detection after the war due to an accident after the war, which permanently scarred his face. However, German prosecutors were able to identify him in 1962. He was subsequently located by the East German Stasi and arrested on January 11, 1967. Blösche was convicted of numerous atrocities and sentenced to death by the Erfurt regional court; he was executed in Leipzig on 29 July 1969.

Career
Blösche was born in Friedland in Böhmen, Austrian Empire (today Frýdlant, Czech Republic). This was in the northern part of Bohemia very near the borders of Germany and Poland. His parents were ethnic Germans: his father, Gustav Blösche, owned a farm and a gasthaus (country inn). Josef began to work on the farm and at the inn while going to school, but his father pulled him out of school at the age of 14 to work full time. 

Blösche participated in right-wing youth organizations promoting Nazi causes, and he joined the Sudeten German Party, a pro-Nazi group advocating German expansion. In 1938, he joined the Nazi Party and the SS after Germany annexed the Sudetenland. Blösche, who had previously volunteered for local SS, was drafted by the Waffen-SS on 4 December 1939 and reported to training the following day at Pretzsch Castle. He completed his training on 14 March 1940 and was assigned to Warsaw. He was shortly assigned to patrolling  of the Bug River. 

After serving in Warsaw with the SS, Blösche joined the Sicherheitsdienst (SD; Security Service), a division of the SS. In 1941, he was briefly transferred to the Eastern Front, where he served with Einsatzkommando 8, a subunit of the death squad Einsatzgruppe B. The unit was responsible for mass shootings in Belarus.

Blösche participated in executions in occupied Belarus, before being transferred back to Warsaw. He served in the SD's Warsaw Ghetto outpost in mid-1942, when the mass deportation of Jews to the Treblinka extermination camp started. Blösche hunted down many Jews who were hiding from deportation. In January 1943, during another wave of deportations to the death camps, he took part in another search, which also involved frequent murders or executions. He participated in the shooting of about 1,000 Jews in April 1943. Blösche later admitted that he personally shot approximately 75 Jews that day. 

The Jews gave Blösche the nickname "Frankenstein", after the Creature from Mary Shelley's novel Frankenstein, for his brutality, including the raping and killing of women in the ghetto. Together with other SS members, he would go on expeditions in the ghetto and shoot random Jews to terrorize the residents, sometimes for merely looking at him. Blösche and one of his acquaintances, Heinrich Klaustermeyer, would sometimes ride a bicycle into the ghetto and shoot any Jews they encountered. According to a Warsaw Ghetto survivor, Blösche "was the worst of all because he killed people for no reason." Blösche participated in the suppression of the Warsaw Ghetto Uprising, and received the German War Merit Cross for his actions during the uprising. He later took part in the suppression of the Warsaw Uprising.

In May 1945, he surrendered to the Red Army and became a prisoner of war of the Soviet Union. Blösche was sent to a camp administered by GUPVI (Main Administration for Affairs of Prisoners of War and Internees). He was forced to perform hard labour, with officials having him work in quarries and build roads. In early 1946, Blösche was repatriated to the Ostrava Region in Czechoslovakia, still as an internee. While working at a coal mine in August 1946, Blösche was struck by a descending hoist and suffered a fractured skull and serious facial injuries. He was hospitalised in Ostrava. 

In the summer 1947, Blösche's labour camp was dissolved and he was set free. His facial scars protected him from discovery as one of the SS troops that were pictured in the official photos taken by Germans of the Warsaw ghetto. He moved to Urbach in Thuringia, East Germany, to begin living a normal life. There, he met a German woman named Hanna Schönstedt, a mother and war widow, and they had two children together before she agreed to marry him. Schönstedt would later say that Blösche's was a very loving husband and father who constantly worried about every ailment of their children. He became a master tradesman at a potash works in Menteroda.

Trial and conviction

In 1961, Klaustermeyer, who was now on trial in West Germany, linked Blösche to the atrocities he had committed in Warsaw. He was identified in 1962. In 1965, shortly after Klaustermeyer's conviction, West Germany requested Blösche's extradition so he could serve as a witness. Blösche was eventually found in Urbach, where he was arrested by the Stasi on 11 January 1967. He was detained in Hohenschönhausen Prison in East Berlin. However, the extradition request was denied and Blösche was instead put on trial in East Germany in Erfurt in April 1969, and convicted of war crimes. Witnesses at the trial described him as a callous sadist. Blösche did not deny the accusations and openly admitted his guilt. He said he did not remember everything, but that the general accusations were true. 

During the trial, the Judge asked Blösche about the events depicted in the infamous photograph of the Warsaw Ghetto boy: 

Judge: "You were with a submachine gun...against a small boy that you extracted from a building with his hands raised. How did those inhabitants react in those moments?" 

Blösche: "They were in tremendous dread." 

Judge: "This reflects well in that little boy. What did you think?" 

Blösche: "We witnessed scenes like these daily. We could not even think."
Blösche was sentenced to death and executed in Leipzig on 29 July 1969 by a single shot to the back of his neck.

Gallery: Warsaw Ghetto Uprising

Citations

References

Further reading
 German TV Documentary (2003) and accompanying book "Der SS-Mann Josef Blösche - Leben und Sterben eines Mörders" (The SS figure Josef Blösche - A Murderer's Life and Death) by Heribert Schwan.
 Richard Raskin. A Child at Gunpoint. A Case Study in the Life of a Photo. Aarhus University Press, 2004. 

1912 births
1969 deaths
Executed Austrian Nazis
German prisoners of war in World War II held by the Soviet Union
Austrian people convicted of crimes against humanity
Nazis executed by East Germany by firearm
Holocaust perpetrators in Belarus
Holocaust perpetrators in Poland
Warsaw Ghetto
Einsatzgruppen personnel
Executed German people
People executed for crimes against humanity
People from Frýdlant
Sudeten German people
Stroop Report
Executed mass murderers